Bassirou Dembélé (born 28 January 1990 in Bamako) is a Malian footballer who last played for Anagennisi Karditsas.

References

External links
 
 

1986 births
Living people
French footballers
Malian footballers
Malian expatriate footballers
SK Slavia Prague players
Enosis Neon Paralimni FC players
Stade Malien players
Expatriate footballers in the Czech Republic
Expatriate footballers in Cyprus
Djoliba AC players
Sportspeople from Bamako
Association football midfielders
21st-century Malian people